Sarcodon dissimulans is a species of tooth fungus in the family Bankeraceae. Found in Nova Scotia, Canada, it was described as new to science in 1984 by mycologist Kenneth A. Harrison. It is characterized as having an "extremely nauseating" taste. Its spores are roughly spherical to oblong, measuring 5–6 by 4–5 µm.

References

External links

Fungi described in 1984
Fungi of Canada
dissimulans
Fungi without expected TNC conservation status